Richard I. Hartley  is an Australian computer scientist and an Emeritus professor at the Australian National University, where he is a member of the Computer Vision group in the Research School of Computing.

Education and career
In 1971, Hartley received a BSc degree from the Australian National University followed by MSc (1972) and PhD (1976) degrees in mathematics from the University of Toronto.  He also obtained an MSc degree in computer science from Stanford University in 1983.

His work is primarily devoted to the fields of Artificial intelligence, Image processing, and Computer vision.  He is best known for his 2000 book Multiple View Geometry in computer vision, written with Andrew Zisserman, now in its second edition (2004). According to WorldCat, the book is held in 1428 libraries.

Hartley was elected a Fellow of the Australian Academy of Science in 2005 and awarded their Hannan Medal in 2023.

Publications 
Hartley has published a wide variety of articles in computer science on the topics of computer vision and optimization. The following are his most highly cited works 
 2000 Multiple View Geometry in computer vision With Andrew Zisserman, Cambridge University press. Second edition 2004. (cited 17,014 times) 
 2000 "Bundle adjustment—a modern synthesis", with Bill Triggs, Philip F McLauchlan, and Andrew W Fitzgibbon in Vision algorithms: theory and practice,  pp. 298–372   (cited 2423 times)
 1997 "In defense of the eight-point algorithm" IEEE Transactions on PAMI 19 (6), 580-593 (cited 2244 times)

References

External links 
  Home Page at Australian National University
  Biography page at ANU
  at videolectures.net

Living people
Computer vision researchers
Academic staff of the Australian National University
Australian computer scientists
Fellows of the Australian Academy of Science
Year of birth missing (living people)